Mue is a 2014 album by Émilie Simon.

Mue or MUE may refer to:
Mue, a tributary of the river Seulles in Normandy, France
Medically Unlikely Edit, a term used in United States Medicare administration
Miyagi University of Education, a university in Japan
Waimea-Kohala Airport (IATA code and FAA LID: MUE)
Magyar Úszó Egylet, Hungarian football club (MÚE)
Media Lengua, language used in Ecuador, ISO code mue